The Carr ministry (1995–1997) or First Carr ministry was the 85th ministry of the New South Wales Government, and was led by the 39th Premier of New South Wales,  Bob Carr, representing the Labor Party.

Composition of ministry
The ministry covers the period from 4 April 1995, when Carr led Labor to victory at the 1995 state election. There were two new assistant roles created early in the ministry, a minor rearrangements in December 1995, a new assistant role in March 1996, and a minor rearrangement in December 1996. The ministry continued until 1 December 1997 when the second Carr ministry was formed.

 
Ministers are members of the Legislative Assembly unless otherwise noted.

See also

 Members of the New South Wales Legislative Assembly, 1995–1999
Members of the New South Wales Legislative Council, 1995–1999

Notes

References

 

! colspan="3" style="border-top: 5px solid #cccccc" | New South Wales government ministries

New South Wales ministries
1995 establishments in Australia
1997 disestablishments in Australia
Australian Labor Party ministries in New South Wales